William Chase may refer to:

 William Merritt Chase (1849–1916), American painter
 William Calvin Chase (1854–1921), African-American lawyer and newspaper editor
 William Martin Chase (1837–1918), justice of the Supreme Court of New Hampshire
 William C. Chase (1895–1986), American general
 William Henry Chase (1798–1870), Florida militia colonel
 William J.J. Chase, American architect of Atlanta, Georgia
 William St Lucien Chase (1856–1908), recipient of the Victoria Cross
 William Chase (entrepreneur) (born 1960), founder of the Tyrrells crisp brand
 William Henry Chase (Canadian entrepreneur) (1851–1933), entrepreneur and philanthropist in Nova Scotia, Canada
 Robert William Chase (1852–1927), British ornithologist

See also 

William Chace